is a Japanese rock band from Kyoto. The band was formed in 2010 by vocalist and guitarist Ikumi "Ikkyu" Nakajima, guitarist Motoko "Motifour" Kida, and bassist Hiromi "Hirohiro" Sagane. Known for their intricate rhythms and visual identity, they have released seven full-length studio albums. Their musical style has been described by Rolling Stone as "adrenalized math rock sped up and given pop's candy coating".

History
Tricot was formed in Kyoto in 2010 by vocalist and guitarist Ikumi "Ikkyu" Nakajima, guitarist Motoko "Motifour" Kida, and bassist Hiromi "Hirohiro" Sagane. Sagane is a native of the city, while Nakajima and Kida are from neighboring Shiga Prefecture. Prior to forming Tricot, the three musicians played in various local bands in the Kyoto area, where they became acquainted with one another. Kazutaka Komaki joined the band as drummer in May 2011. Shortly after, Tricot established its own label, Bakuretsu Records. On October 2, 2013, the band released their first full-length studio album T H E, which peaked at number 18 on the Oricon Albums Chart. In March 2014, Komaki left the band due to musical differences. In his absence, the remaining trio opted to tour and record with a rotating cast of musicians. Later that year, Tricot embarked on a tour of five Asian countries, followed by a tour of Europe in which they performed at several music festivals, including the Eden Sessions festival in the United Kingdom, where they supported Pixies.

Tricot's second studio album A N D was released on March 18, 2015 and peaked at number 34 on the Oricon chart. They subsequently staged a tour of North America, Japan and Europe, titled the Yattokosa Tour, from October 2015 to March 2016. The band's third studio album, 3, was issued on May 17, 2017, reaching number 20 on the Oricon chart. It was supported by the Tricot vs 47 tour, which saw the band performing in each of Japan's 47 prefectures, and a European tour. At the end of the final concert of the Tricot vs 47 tour, it was announced that Yusuke Yoshida, who had been touring with Tricot since 2016, had become a full-time member and thus the second official drummer in the band's history. Tricot undertook their second tour of North America in 2018.

In 2018, Nakajima formed the band Genie High along with comedians Kazutoyo Koyabu and Kukki and musicians Enon Kawatani and Takashi Niigaki.

Tricot released their fourth studio album Black on January 29, 2020, and it reached number 27 on the Oricon chart. Black was the band's first album to be released by 8902, their newly established label under Cutting Edge.

To celebrate the tenth anniversary of their formation, Tricot released a new studio album on October 21, 2020 entitled 10, which peaked at number 48 on the Oricon chart.

Jodeki, Tricot's sixth studio album, was released on December 15, 2021, peaking at number 50 on the Oricon chart. It is the band's first double album, consisting of 24 tracks: 12 songs on the first disc, and their instrumental versions on the second disc. Supporting the album, the band toured Japan and Europe in the Walking x Walking Tour.

On December 14, 2022, Tricot released their seventh studio album Fudeki; like Jodeki, it is a 24-track double album with instrumentals of each song on the second disc. Fudeki was preceded by lead single "End Roll", released in February 2022 as the opening theme for the Japanese TV series Liar.

Members
Current members
 Ikkyu Nakajima – vocals, rhythm guitar (2010–present)
 Motifour Kida – lead guitar, backing vocals (2010–present)
 Hiromi Hirohiro – bass guitar, backing vocals (2010–present)
 Yusuke Yoshida – drums (2017–present; 2016–2017, touring)

Former members
 Kazutaka Komaki – drums (2011–2014)
 Miyoko Yamaguchi – drums (2015–2016, touring)

Discography

Studio albums

Video albums

Extended plays

Notes

Singles

References

External links
 
 

Japanese rock music groups
Japanese indie rock groups
Japanese post-rock groups
Math rock groups
Musical groups established in 2010
Musical groups from Kyoto Prefecture
Avex Group artists
Topshelf Records artists
2010 establishments in Japan